Nowell Sotherton (died c. 1610) of St. Botolph's-without-Aldersgate, London, was an English politician.

Family
He married Timothea and they had several children. By the time of his death, he had one surviving daughter and a grandson. The Sotherton family were originally from Suffolk and the poor of London and Suffolk were remembered in his will, as was Giles Fettiplace.

Career
He was a Member (MP) of the Parliament of England for Dorchester in 1589 and for St Ives in 1593 and 1597, and of Gray's Inn.

References

16th-century births
1610 deaths
People from the City of London
Politicians from London
English MPs 1589
English MPs 1593
English MPs 1597–1598
Members of Gray's Inn
Members of the Parliament of England for Dorchester
Members of the Parliament of England for St Ives